Broomhill is a small village in County Armagh, Northern Ireland. It is within the townland of Drumnahunshin and the Armagh City and District Council area. It had a population of 197 people (91 households) in the 2011 Census. (2001 Census: 213 people)

References

See also 
List of towns and villages in Northern Ireland

Villages in County Armagh